Józef Celmajster (later Józef Niemirski) (born 27 December 1901 - 7 December 1968 in Warsaw, Poland) was a Polish physician of Jewish descent, first lieutenant of the Polish Army, chief of medical department of the Jewish Military Union (ŻZW) in the Warsaw Ghetto and OW-KB.

Celmajster, a graduate of the University of Wilno, participated in the 1939 Defensive War and the Warsaw Ghetto Uprising. Later deported to the German concentration camp Auschwitz and survived.

After World War II he worked as physician.

Military decorations
Polonia Restituta

References
Tadeusz Bednarczyk – Życie codzienne warszawskiego getta (Warsaw 1995)
Marian Apfelbaum - Two flags: Return to the Warsaw Ghetto

1901 births
1968 deaths
Warsaw Ghetto Uprising insurgents
Jewish Military Union members
Jewish resistance members during the Holocaust
Polish military doctors
Auschwitz concentration camp survivors
Burials at Powązki Military Cemetery
Polish Army officers
20th-century Polish physicians